Troy Anthony Drayton (born June 29, 1970) is a former professional American football tight end from 1993 to 2001. He played in 9 seasons in the National Football League (NFL), mainly for the Los Angeles/St. Louis Rams and the Miami Dolphins. He was All-America at Pennsylvania State University where he played from 1989 to 1992. He currently resides in Coral Springs, Florida.

External links
Former Penn State TE Drayton surprises mom, finally gets degree, The Sporting News, May 16, 2008
Troy Drayton: My Five Most Memorable Games, The Finsiders, June 25, 2013
Penn State great Troy Drayton says he won't watch Nittany Lions until names come off jerseys, Dustin Hockensmith, PennLive, August 30, 2013

1970 births
Living people
Players of American football from Harrisburg, Pennsylvania
American football tight ends
Penn State Nittany Lions football players
Los Angeles Rams players
St. Louis Rams players
Miami Dolphins players
Kansas City Chiefs players
Sportspeople from Coral Springs, Florida